Arcesilaus I of Cyrene (flourished late 7th and early 6th centuries BC), also spelled Arkesilaos I, was the second Greek king of Cyrenaica and the second king of the Battiad dynasty.

Ancestry
Arcesilaus was the son of Battus I, the first king of Cyrenaica and Cyrene. Arcesilaus’ paternal grandparents were the Cretan Princess Phronima and the distinguished Therean nobleman called Polymnestus.

Reign
Very little is known on the life and reign of Arcesilaus. He succeeded to the throne after the death of his father in 600 BC. Herodotus says that the number of people in Cyrene during his reign remained equal to the original number of settlers under Battus. Arcesilaus died in 583 BC and was buried near his father.

Offspring
His son, Battus II, succeeded him. Arcesilaus also had a daughter called Critola.

See also
 List of Kings of Cyrene
 Cyrene
 Cyrenaica

Sources
Herodotus, The Histories, Book 4.
Dictionary of Greek and Roman Biography and Mythology at Google Books
Cyrene in A Dictionary of Greek and Roman Geography, by William Smith (1873)

7th-century BC Greek people
6th-century BC Greek people
Kings of Cyrene
583 BC deaths
6th-century BC rulers
Year of birth unknown